Nino Shalvovna Ramishvili (January 19, 1910 - September 6, 2000) was a Georgian ballet dancer, choreographer, and the co-founder of the Sukhishvili Georgian National Ballet. She is the most famous Georgian dancer.

Career
From 1922 to 1927, Ramishvili studied at the ballet school of Maria Perini in Tbilisi.

From 1927 to 1936, she was the soloist of the ballet theater Paliashvili, where she performed in productions of Abesalom and Eteri, Daisi, The Tale of Shota Rustaveli, Keto and Kote, and Tsisana.

In 1945, together with her husband Iliko Sukhishvili, Ramishvili founded the Sukhishvili Georgian National Ballet, initially called the Georgian State Dance Company, where she became soloist and dance teacher until 1972.

In 1972, she became chief choreographer of the Sukhishvili Georgian National Ballet.

References

External links
 Судьба красоты — Нино Рамишвили

Ballerinas from Georgia (country)
1910 births
2000 deaths
Burials at Didube Pantheon
Rustaveli Prize winners
Heroes of Socialist Labour
Recipients of the Order of Lenin
Soviet ballerinas
Soviet choreographers
People's Artists of the USSR
Stalin Prize winners
Women choreographers
Female dancers from Tbilisi